The 2006–07 Mid-American Conference women's basketball season began with practices in October 2006, followed by the start of the 2006–07 NCAA Division I women's basketball season in November. Conference play began in January 2007 and concluded in March 2007. Bowling Green won the regular season title with a record of 16–1 over West Division champion Ball State. Ali Mann of Bowling Green and Carrie Moore of Western Michigan shared MAC player of the year.

Regular season champion Bowling Green won the MAC tournament over Ball State. Carin Horne of Bowling Green was the tournament MVP. Bowling Green defeated Oklahoma State and Vanderbilt before losing to Arizona State in the Sweet Sixteen of the NCAA tournament. Ball State played in the WNIT.

Preseason Awards
The preseason poll was announced by the league office on October 24, 2006.

Preseason women's basketball poll
(First place votes in parenthesis)

East Division
  (40) 245
  (1) 193
  136
 Ohio 115
  112
  60

West Division
  (21) 214
  (8) 188 
  996) 157
  (6) 142
  94
  66

Tournament Champion
Bowling Green (35), Kent State (2), Western Michigan (2), Toledo (1)

Honors

Postseason

Mid–American tournament

NCAA tournament

Women's National Invitational Tournament

Postseason Awards

Coach of the Year: Curt Miller, Bowling Green
Player of the Year: Ali Mann, Bowling Green and Carrie Moore, Western Michigan
Freshman of the Year: Alyssa Pittman, Eastern Michigan
Defensive Player of the Year: Patrice McKinney, Eastern Michigan
Sixth Man of the Year: Amber Flynn, Bowling Green

Honors

See also
 2006–07 Mid-American Conference men's basketball season

References